ATSE may refer to:

 Atse, Emperor of Ethiopia
 Australian Academy of Technological Sciences and Engineering